Koṇāgamana (Pāli), also known as Kanakamuni in Sanskrit or alternatively Koṇāgon or Kanakagamana, is one of the ancient Buddhas whose biography is chronicled in chapter 23 of the Buddhavaṃsa, one of the books of the Pali Canon.

Buddhist tradition
According to Theravāda Buddhist tradition, Koṇāgamana is the twenty-sixth of the twenty-nine named Buddhas, the fifth of the Seven Buddhas of Antiquity, and the second of the five Buddhas of the present kalpa.

The present kalpa is called the bhadrakalpa (Auspicious aeon). The five Buddhas of the present kalpa are:
 Kakusandha (the first Buddha of the bhadrakalpa)
 Koṇāgamana (the second Buddha of the bhadrakalpa)
 Kassapa (the third Buddha of the bhadrakalpa)
 Gautama (the fourth and present Buddha of the bhadrakalpa)
 Maitreya (the fifth and future Buddha of the bhadrakalpa)

Historical mentions of the Koṇāgamana Buddha
Koṇāgamana is mentioned in a 3rd-century BCE inscription by Ashoka at Nigali Sagar, in today's Nepal. There is an Ashoka pillar at the site today. Ashoka's inscription in Brahmi is on the fragment of the pillar still partly buried in the ground. The inscription made when Emperor Asoka at Nigali Sagar in 249 BCE records his visit, the enlargement of a stupa dedicated to the Kanakamuni Buddha, and the erection of a pillar:

According to Xuanzang, Koṇāgamana's relics were held in a stupa in Nigali Sagar, in what is now Kapilvastu District in southern Nepal.

See also
 Bhadrakalpikasutra

Gallery

References

Buddhas